The 2018 Orienteering World Cup was the 24th edition of the Orienteering World Cup. The 2018 Orienteering World Cup consisted of 11 individual events and  9 relay events. The events were located in Switzerland, Latvia, Norway and Czech Republic. The European Orienteering Championships in Ticino, Switzerland and the 2018 World Orienteering Championships in Riga, Latvia were included in the World Cup. 

Matthias Kyburz of Switzerland won his third consecutive overall title in the men's World Cup, his fifth title in total. Tove Alexandersson of Sweden won her fifth overall title in the women's World Cup.

Events

Men

Women

Relay

Points distribution
The 40 best runners in each event were awarded points. The winner was awarded 100 points. In WC events 1 to 9, the eight best results counted in the overall classification. In the finals (WC 10 and WC 11), both results counted.

Overall standings
This section shows the final standings after all 10 individual events.

Relay
The table shows the final standings after all 9 relay events. All results counted in the overall standings.

Achievements
Only individual competitions.

References

External links
 World Cup Ranking - IOF
 2018 Team World Cup Results - IOF

Orienteering World Cup seasons
Orienteering competitions
2018 in orienteering